Lincoln City Libraries is the official public library system in Lincoln, Nebraska, United States. It has eight branches.

The main location is Bennett Martin Public Library in Lincoln's downtown area, which includes three floors and a basement. Bennett Martin is also home to Lilian H. Polley Music Library and the Jane Pope Geske Heritage Room of Nebraska Authors.  The other library locations are the Victor E. Anderson, Bethany Branch, Loren Corey Eiseley, Charles H. Gere, Bess Dodson Walt and Dan A. Williams branches.

Information
Lincoln City Libraries provides services to Lincoln and Lancaster County residents. The library system owns over 880,000 items, which together allow yearly circulation totals to exceed three million checkouts. In addition to circulation, LCL provides youth, teen, and adult programming to its customers throughout the year.

Lincoln City Libraries was evaluated in 2003 by Dubberly Garcia Associates, who performed a customer and non-user survey. The survey concluded that nearly 86% of customers were either 'satisfied" or 'very satisfied' with the library. Dubberly Garcia Associates indicated this was the second highest score among twenty-one similarly sized library systems throughout the country. Additionally, Hennen's American Public Library Ratings has often ranked Lincoln City Libraries as one of the top ten in the nation in its population category based on circulation, staff, materials and reference service.

Lincoln City Libraries does not charge overdue fees for materials designated for youth or children, effective January 2019.

History 
In 1875 the Lincoln City Library and Reading Room Association was formed as a private organization. In 1877, the Nebraska State Legislature passed a bill allowing the municipal governments of any community in the state of Nebraska to form a public library system and the Lincoln City Library and Reading Room Association was subsequently incorporated as a city-owned and tax-funded organization the same year.

In 1899, all but the 800 books on loan to patrons were lost to a fire which destroyed the Masonic Temple in which the library was housed. In response, prominent Lincolnites such as Mary Baird Bryan, wife of William Jennings Bryan, petitioned Andrew Carnegie to help provide a library building for the city. Carnegie was a library patron, establishing over 2,000 libraries worldwide, and agreed to fund the construction of a library building for the city if the public would raise funds to purchase the site. The people of Lincoln, from schoolchildren to socialites, raised $10,000 to purchase property at 14th and N streets. The library was opened in 1902 and became nicknamed Old Main. In total, Andrew Carnegie funded the construction of five Lincoln City Libraries, though at the time of their construction three were located in suburbs of Lincoln which were later annexed. Carnegie financed the construction of public libraries in the towns of Havelock, University Place, and College View as well as a branch library in Northeast Lincoln.

In 1937, the Bethany Library was opened in a former bank building and was stocked by the donated collections of the Bethany Women's Club and the Bethany Women's Missionary Society. In 1958, the current Bethany Branch Library was built to replace it. In 1955, the South Branch Library was opened at 27th and South streets.

Old Main served the city until 1960 when it was replaced by a new building on the same site financed by a $300,000 donation by Bennett and Dorothy Martin. Bennett Martin served a term on the Lincoln City Council in the early 1950s and was mayor of Lincoln from 1956 to 1959, the Bennett Martin Public Library honors his public service and donation. In 1967, Lilian Helms Polley financed the addition of the North and East wings of Bennett Martin Library. In 1977, a subsequent addition created two more floors on the library which house the administrative offices and the Jane Pope Geske Heritage Room of Nebraska Authors.

By 1971, the Carnegie libraries in the neighborhoods of Havelock and University Place were replaced by the Victor E. Anderson Branch Library and the College View Library was replaced by the Charles H. Gere Branch Library. The Carnegie-funded Northeast Branch Library, built in 1909, continued to function as a branch library until 1982. The building was preserved and relocated to become part of the Matt Talbot Community Kitchen and Outreach Center.

In 2002, the Bess Dodson Walt Branch Library and Loren Corey Eiseley Branch Library were opened in southwest and north Lincoln respectively.  The Eiseley Branch Library replaced the smaller Belmont and Arnold Heights libraries.

References 

 Public Libraries Survey, 2012
 Hennen's American Public Library Ratings: Nebraska, 2010

External links 
 Official site (also lincolnlibraries.org)

Education in Lincoln, Nebraska
Public libraries in Nebraska
Education in Lancaster County, Nebraska